Major-General Jonathan David Shaw  (born 22 November 1957) is a former British Army officer.

Military career
Educated at Sedbergh School and Trinity College, Oxford, where he studied PPE, Shaw was commissioned into the Parachute Regiment in 1981. He was a platoon commander with 3rd Battalion, Parachute Regiment during the Falklands War. Having attended Staff College, Camberley between 1989 and 1990, he was appointed Commanding Officer of 2nd Battalion, Parachute Regiment in 1997.

After attending the Higher Command and Staff Course at the Joint Services Command and Staff College in 2000, he was made Commander of 12th (Mechanized) Brigade in 2002 and subsequently commanded the Multi-National Brigade (Centre) in Kosovo. He was appointed Director Special Forces in 2003, and having attended the Royal College of Defence Studies in 2006, he became General Officer Commanding Multi-National Division (South East), Iraq in January 2007 and went on to be Chief of Staff at HQ Land Forces in September 2007. He became Assistant Chief of Defence Staff (International Security Policy) in March 2009 and Assistant Chief of Defence Staff (Global Issues) in January 2011. His responsibilities include Chemical Biological Radiological & Nuclear Policy, Arms Control and Counter Proliferation and Cyber.

He was appointed Companion of the Order of the Bath (CB) in the 2012 Birthday Honours. He retired from the Army in 2012.

Family
He is married to Gillie, a partner in a firm of lawyers; they have two children.

Publications

References

|-

1957 births
Living people
Alumni of Trinity College, Oxford
Companions of the Order of the Bath
Commanders of the Order of the British Empire
British Army generals
Graduates of the Staff College, Camberley
British Parachute Regiment officers
British Army personnel of the Falklands War
British Army personnel of the Iraq War
Graduates of the Joint Services Command and Staff College
People educated at Sedbergh School
Military personnel from Leeds